Steven Whitney (born February 18, 1991) is an American professional ice hockey forward. He currently plays for Iserlohn Roosters in the Deutsche Eishockey Liga (DEL). He previously played for the Norfolk Admirals during their tenure in the American Hockey League (AHL) and the Hershey Bears.

Playing career
Whitney played college hockey with the Boston College Eagles in the NCAA Men's Division I Hockey East conference. In his senior year, Whitney's outstanding play was rewarded with a selection to the 2012–13 All-Hockey East First Team. On April 4, 2013, Whitney was signed as an undrafted free agent to a two-year entry level contract with the Anaheim Ducks.

After his first full professional season with Anaheim AHL affiliate, the Norfolk Admirals in the 2013–14 season, Whitney sought a release from his contract and on October 21, 2014, he was placed on unconditional waivers in confirming the end of his association with the Ducks. He signed with the Florida Everblades on Feb. 12, 2015.

On August 14, 2015, Whitney returned to the Norfolk Admirals, now placed in the ECHL, signing a one-year deal as a free agent. After two seasons in the ECHL with the Admirals, Whitney left as a free agent to sign with fellow competitors the South Carolina Stingrays on August 28, 2017.

On October 5, 2018, Whitney was announced to have secured an AHL contract with the Stingray's AHL affiliate, the Hershey Bears, making the opening night roster for the 2018–19 season.

On March 1, 2021, it was announced, Whitney signed a contract for the remainder of the season with German club, the Iserlohn Roosters where his brother Joe Whitney has played since November 27, 2020.

Career statistics

Regular season and playoffs

International

Awards and honors

References

External links 

1991 births
Living people
American men's ice hockey forwards
Boston College Eagles men's ice hockey players
Florida Everblades players
Hershey Bears players
Iserlohn Roosters players
Norfolk Admirals players
Norfolk Admirals (ECHL) players
Omaha Lancers players
South Carolina Stingrays players
AHCA Division I men's ice hockey All-Americans